Gluttony is the propensity for over-eating, or over-eating considered as a vice.

Gluttony may also refer to:
one of the seven deadly sins
Gluttony (Fullmetal Alchemist), a character from the anime and manga series Fullmetal Alchemist
Gluttony, a miniboss in the video games The Binding of Isaac and The Binding of Isaac: Rebirth
 ''Gluttony (novel)
"Gluttony", one of three venue hubs  in the Adelaide Fringe

See also
Glutton (disambiguation)
Glutonny, a French professional computer gamer